Sobrino de Botín is a Spanish restaurant in Madrid, and the oldest restaurant in the world in continuous operation.  The artist Francisco de Goya worked in Café Botín as a waiter while waiting to get accepted into the Royal Academy of Fine Arts. The restaurant is mentioned in an Ernest Hemingway novel and the book Fortunata y Jacinta by Benito Pérez Galdós (published 1886–1887).

History
The restaurant was founded in 1725 by Frenchman Jean Botin and his wife, and was originally called Casa Botín. Upon Botin's death in 1753., a nephew called Candido Remis changed the name to Sobrino de Botín, which survives to this day. Sobrino is the Spanish word for nephew.

The cellar is from 1590 and is older than the restaurant.

Apart from using the original recipes, the restaurant has also kept the flame burning in the oven continuously, never to be extinguished. The restaurant and its speciality of cochinillo asado (roast suckling pig) are mentioned in the closing pages of Ernest Hemingway's novel The Sun Also Rises. Its other signature dish is sopa de ajo (an egg, poached in chicken broth, and laced with sherry and garlic): a favorite pick-me-up with Madrileño revellers.

Botin Puerto Rico 
In 2007, Puerto Rican actress Von Marie Mendez and her husband, Dr. Vicente Sanchez, in association with Sobrino de Botin, opened a restaurant in Ponce, Puerto Rico, named "Botin". The opening of the Puerto Rican location was attended by several well known celebrities, including former governor of Puerto Rico Rafael Hernandez Colon and then current governor Anibal Acevedo Vila, actor Braulio Castillo, hijo and Mexican singer and actor Fernando Allende.

External links 

Restaurants in Madrid
1725 establishments in Spain